Hacallı (also, Hajaly and Hajally) is a village in the Barda Rayon of Azerbaijan.

References

Populated places in Barda District